Raymond Charles Ewing (born September 7, 1936 Cleveland, Ohio) was an American Career Foreign Service Officer who served as the Ambassador Extraordinary and Plenipotentiary to Cyprus (1981-1984) and Ghana (1989-1992).

When Ewing was seven, he and his family moved first to Berkeley, California, and then Santa Cruz, California. He went on to graduate from Occidental College, class of 1957, as a history major. He entered the Foreign Service shortly after his 21st birthday. He would later earn a MPA from Harvard University.

References

1936 births
Ambassadors of the United States to Ghana
Ambassadors of the United States to Cyprus
Occidental College alumni
Harvard Kennedy School alumni
People from Cleveland
People from Berkeley, California
People from Santa Cruz, California
United States Foreign Service personnel
Living people